The Battle of Arbalo was a fight between the Romans and the Germani in 11 B.C. It was part of the Drusus Campaigns (12 – 8 B.C.) This campaign started with the unstable north of the Roman empire near Gaul, with the Germanic from the east of Gaul constantly attacking Rome, Augustus would send Drusus. 

As part of operations by Augustus to secure the borders of the Roman Empire, Drusus, military commander and stepson of Augustus, was given the order to pacify the region on either side of the River Rhine. In spring 11 B. C. he crossed the Rhine with his army and defeated the Usipetes. He built a bridge over the Lippe and marched through the territory of the Sugambri and the Cherusci to the Weser.

During its return march to the Rhine the army was lured into an ambush at a place called Arbalo. It was attacked in a narrow pass by Cherusci.

Using the element of surprise and their advantageous position, the Germans were winning until they decided to retreat for some time, allowing the Romans to break through the force defending one of the exits and escape. After the battle, Drusus would build a fortified fort where the battle take place. However, only 2 years after the battle of Arbalo, Drusus would pass away after falling off a horse.

Arbalo is thought to be near modern-day Hameln or Hildesheim. At the end of the campaign, The Roman was able to secure their lands to the north.

References

Citations

Bibliography
 Pliny, Nat. Hist. 11, 28, 55.
 Cassius Dio, Rom. Hist., 54, 32–36 and 55, 1–2.

Arbalo
Arbalo
11 BC
1st-century BC battles
10s BC conflicts
Roman campaigns in Germania (12 BC – AD 16)